The Longford county football team represents Longford in men's Gaelic football and is governed by Longford GAA, the county board of the Gaelic Athletic Association. The team competes in the three major annual inter-county competitions; the All-Ireland Senior Football Championship, the Leinster Senior Football Championship and the National Football League.

Longford's home ground is Pearse Park, Longford. The team's manager is Paddy Christie.

The team last won the Leinster Senior Championship in 1968 and the National League in 1966. Longford has never won the All-Ireland Senior Championship.

Crest and colours
The Longford county colours are royal blue and gold. Green and white hooped jerseys were reputedly used by Longford until 1918 when a royal blue jersey with a gold sash was adopted. Around 1930 the sash disappeared but the gold trim was retained.

History
During the 1960s Mick Higgins was the coach of Longford when it won the National Football League (1966) and its first (and at the time of his death only) Leinster Senior Football Championship (SFC) (1968). He also led them to an O'Byrne Cup title in 1965.

Jackie Devine set up two goals for Longford in the last six minutes of the 1968 Leinster SFC final to beat Laois by 3-9 to 1-4, where Sean Donnelly and Jim Hannify were the scorers. It was their only Leinster SFC title, and it came two years after a great victory over Galway on a scoreline of nine points to eight in the National League final. Longford also won the O'Byrne Cup in 1965, 2000 & 2020.

When Longford lost a replayed Leinster SFC semi-final in 1970 it was the county's fourth semi-final in six years and 8th time reaching the semi-final stage. After 1970, Longford reached the Leinster SFC semi-final twice, in 1988 and 2018 (losing to Dublin on both occasions).

Brendan Hackett managed the team between 1987 and 1990 in his first managerial role at inter-county level. Longford made the 1988 Leinster SFC semi-finals and also two quarter-finals of the National Football League.

Victories over Westmeath and Wicklow in 1988 left the county on the verge of a Leinster SFC final after 20 years. The team played well against Dublin and led by three points at half-time. Team manager and sports psychologist Hackett cited what happened next as an example of lack of self-belief in extremis: Dublin drew level with twenty minutes remaining and won by 18 points.

Since first defeating Meath in the 1928 Leinster Championship, Longford has a decent record against that opponent in that competition and had a surprise victory in 1982. Longford forced Offaly to a replay in 1984, but the promise of the under-21 teams that reached successive Leinster finals in 1981 and 1982 failed to materialise. In 2002, the county's minor team won the Leinster Minor Football Championship, the following year the county vocational schools team won the All-Ireland Vocational Schools Championship at A and B level, the only county to do so.

Eamonn Coleman was manager of Longford in 1996 & 1997. He was replaced by Michael McCormack in 1997. 

2001 saw Longford surrender the O'Byrne Cup in the opening round. The league saw Longford win four from the first five games, but defeats to Monaghan and Kildare in the final round meant there was no promotion. The championship began with victory over Louth in Navan to set up an SFC quarter-final against Dublin. Longford ultimately won well in that game, at Croke Park. 2001 also saw the introduction of the back door, or qualifiers. Longford's first second chance outing was away to Wicklow, though Longford lost by a scoreline of 1-14 to 0-11.

Denis Connerton was appointed manager in 2001 and managed the team until 2004 when he was replaced by Luke Dempsey. 

Glenn Ryan replaced Luke Dempsey as manager and managed the team from 2009. In Ryan's first year in charge Longford were knocked out in the first round of the Leinster Senior Football Championship by Wicklow. They then went into the Qualifiers where they beat Leitrim 0–13 to 0–10 before they ran Kerry close in Round 2 going down 1–12 to 0–11.

Ryan's second year in charge once again seen his side go out in the first round in Leinster losing out to Louth, they once again entered the Qualifiers, in round 1 they pulled off the shock of the championship when they beat Mayo 1–12 to 0–14, in Round 2 Down proved too good and ran out 1–14 to 1–10 winners.

2011 started out well for Ryan and Longford when they beat Roscommon by 2–11 to 1–08 to take the National League Div 4 title.

In 2012, Longford again had a good start to the year this time by winning the Div 3 National League title with a win over Wexford giving Ryan and Longford back-to-back titles.

In August 2013, Ryan vacated the Longford senior management role.

In 2010, 2011 and 2012, Damien Sheridan won the All-Ireland Kick Fada Championship.

In October 2013, Jack Sheedy was confirmed as the team's new manager. The footballers had mixed fortunes in 2014. The Leinster SFC campaign finally yielded a win over Offaly for new manager Jack Sheedy on a scoreline of 0-19 to 0-15, but a 1-13 to 1-15 defeat to Wexford followed in the quarter-final, in the sunshine of Pearse Park. The All-Ireland SFC qualifier draw paired Longford with Derry, a high-scoring game which Longford won by two points. However, in the next round, Tipperary inflicted a 17-point defeat on Longford to end the county's 2014 championship campaign.

Denis Connerton replaced Sheedy as manager in 2015; it was Connerton's second spell in charge having previously managed the team during the 2002 and 2004 seasons.

Former player Padraic Davis took over as manager in 2018. Davis was given a two-year extension in 2020 until the end of 2022. But he quit at the end of the 2021 season after losing to Meath by 22 points, referring to his family, his property market job and the difficulties of managing at that level.

Laois native Billy O'Loughlin was appointed Longford manager in November 2021.  He resigned at the end of the 2022 season, citing work commitments. Paddy Christie replaced him.

Current panel

INJ Player has had an injury which has affected recent involvement with the county team.
RET Player has since retired from the county team.
WD Player has since withdrawn from the county team due to a non-injury issue.

Current management team
Ratified for a three-year term in August 2022
Manager: Paddy Christie
Backroom: Dessie Sloyan, James Glancy 
Selectors: 

Strength and conditioning coach:

Managerial history

Players

Notable players

All Stars
Longford has no All Stars.

Team of the Millennium
Longford's Team of the Millennium  was unique as it contained the only father and son combination in the country; Drumlish's Jim Hannify Snr and Jnr.
The start of the new millennium also saw the selection of Longford's Team of the Millennium as follows:

Honours

National
National Football League 
 Winners (1): 1965–66
National Football League Division 2
 Winners (2): 1937, 1972
National Football League Division 3
 Winners (1): 2012
National Football League Division 4
 Winners (1): 2011
All-Ireland Junior Football Championship
 Winners (1): 1937
All-Ireland Vocational Schools Championship
 Winners (2): 2003, 2013

Provincial
Leinster Senior Football Championship
 Winners (1): 1968
 Runners-up (1): 1965
O'Byrne Cup
 Winners (4): 1965, 2000, 2020, 2023
Leinster Junior Football Championship
 Winners (3): 1924 (awarded), 1937, 1953
Leinster Under-21 Football Championship
 Runners-up (7): 1966, 1981, 1982, 2003, 2006, 2011, 2013
Leinster Minor Football Championship
 Winners (4): 1929, 1938, 2002, 2010
 Runners-up (3): 1930, 1974, 2015

References

 
County football teams